Sultan Mandash (born October 17, 1994), is a Saudi Arabian footballer who plays as a winger and attacking midfielder for Al-Fayha.

External links 
 

1994 births
Living people
Ittihad FC players
Najran SC players
Al-Faisaly FC players
Al-Ahli Saudi FC players
Al-Taawoun FC players
Al-Fayha FC players
Sportspeople from Jeddah
Saudi Arabian footballers
Saudi Professional League players
Association football wingers